Stan is a masculine given name, often a short form (hypocorism) of Stanley or Stanford or Stanislaus. Notable persons with that name include:

 Stan Blake (born 1954), American politician
 Stan Brakhage (1933–2003), American filmmaker
 Stanley Stan Coveleski (1880–1984), American Major League Baseball pitcher born Stanislaus Kowalewski
 Stan Davis (disambiguation)
 Stan Fairbairn (1886–1943), Australian rules footballer
 Stanley Stan Galazin (1915–1989), American National Football League player
 Stanley Stan Getz (1927–1991), American jazz saxophonist
 Stan Ghițescu (1881–1952), Romanian politician and government minister
 Stan Grant (journalist) (born 1963), Australian journalist
 Stanley Stan Grant (Wiradjuri elder) (born 1940), elder of the Wiradjuri tribe of Indigenous Australians
 Stanley Stan Heath (born 1964), American college basketball coach
 Stanley Stan Heath (gridiron football) (1927–2010), American football quarterback
 Stanley Stan Heptinstall (born 1946), British academic and politician
 Stanley Stan Isaacs (1929–2013), American sportswriter and columnist
 Stan Jones (disambiguation)
 Stanley Stan Kenton (1911–1979), American jazz pianist, composer and arranger
 Wallace Stanfield Stan Lane (born 1953), American retired pro wrestler and commentator 
 Stan Laurel (1890–1965), English comic actor, writer and film director, half of comedy duo Laurel and Hardy, born Arthur Stanley Jefferson
 Stan Lee (1922–2018), American comic-book writer, editor, publisher, media producer, television host, actor and former president and chairman of Marvel Comics, born Stanley Lieber
 Stanley Stan Love (basketball) (born 1949), American former National Basketball Association player
 Stanley Stan Mortensen (1921–1991), English footballer
 Constant Stan Ockers (1920–1956), Belgian racing cyclist
 Stanley Stan Olejniczak (1912–1979), American National Football League player
 Stan Mikita (born 1940), Slovak-Canadian Hall-of-Fame National Hockey League player born Stanislav Gvoth
 Stanley Stan Musial (1920–2013), American Hall-of-Fame Major League Baseball player born Stanisław Franciszek Musia
 Stan Ioan Pătraș (1908–1977), Romanian wood sculptor
 Stan Rogers (1949–1983), Canadian folk singer and songwriter
 Stan Rosen (1906–1984), American NFL football player
 Stan Ross (disambiguation)
 Stan Shaw (born 1952), American actor
 Stan Smith (disambiguation)
 Stan Thomas (disambiguation)
 Stan VanDerBeek (1927–1984), American experimental filmmaker
 Stanislas Stan Wawrinka (born 1985), Swiss tennis player
 Stanley Stan White (linebacker) (born 1949), American former National Football League player
 Stan White (quarterback) (born 1971), American former National Football League player
 Stan White (politician), North Carolina state senator (2011–2012)
 Stan Williams (disambiguation)
 Stanley Stan Wright (rugby union) (born 1978), Cook Islands international rugby union player
 Stan Wright (track coach) (1921–1998), first black head coach of a United States track and field team
 Stan Wright (Australian rules footballer) (born 1918), Australian rules footballer

English-language masculine given names
Romanian masculine given names
Hypocorisms
English masculine given names